Khairbani  is a village development committee in Mahottari District in the Janakpur Zone of south-eastern Nepal. At the time of the 1991 Nepal census it had a population of 5629 people living in 1025 individual households. But now it had a population 9140 according to 2068 Nepal census. Here is also a holy place named Geurkadham(Temple of Lord shiva).

References

External links
UN map of the municipalities of Mahottari District

Populated places in Mahottari District